Stephen Bolles (June 25, 1866July 8, 1941) was an American politician, a newspaper editor, and a congressman from Wisconsin.

Early life
Born in Springboro, Crawford County, Pennsylvania, Bolles attended the public schools; was graduated from the State Normal School of Pennsylvania at Slippery Rock, Pennsylvania, in 1888 and from the law department of Milton College, Milton, Wisconsin.

Career
In his early career, Bolles worked as reporter, correspondent, managing editor, and publisher of newspapers in Ohio, Pennsylvania, and New York from 1893 to 1901. Along with Mark Bennett, he was a superintendent of the press department of the Pan-American Exposition at Buffalo, New York, in 1901,  and was reportedly among those with President William McKinley when the President was assassinated while visiting the Exposition.

Bolles was managing editor of the Buffalo Enquirer in 1902 and 1903; superintendent of graphic arts of the St. Louis Exposition from 1903 to 1905; and director of publicity of the Jamestown Exposition in 1907. He was engaged as a special writer and also in private business, including the "brokerage" business, in Atlanta, Georgia, from 1907 to 1919. In 1920, he moved to Janesville, Wisconsin, as editor of the Janesville Gazette  and remained until 1939.

Elected to the 76th and the 77th United States Congress as a Republican, Bolles served as United States representative for the first district of Wisconsin from January 3, 1939, until his death in 1941. As a congressman, Bolles was fiercely opposed to the Lend-Lease policy and tried to exclude the Soviet Union from the Lend-Lease program.

Death
Bolles died in Washington, D.C., on July 8, 1941 (age 75 years, 13 days). He is interred at Oak Hill Cemetery, Janesville, Wisconsin. His grandchildren include Don Bolles, an investigative journalist murdered in 1976, author Richard Nelson Bolles, philosophy professor David L. Bolles, and author Edmund Blair Bolles.

See also
 List of United States Congress members who died in office (1900–49)

References

External links

1866 births
1941 deaths
19th-century American newspaper publishers (people)
American newspaper publishers (people)
American newspaper editors
Slippery Rock University of Pennsylvania alumni
Milton College alumni
Politicians from Janesville, Wisconsin
People from Springboro, Pennsylvania
Republican Party members of the United States House of Representatives from Wisconsin